William le Gentil (fl. 1307–1311) was an English politician.

He was a Member (MP) of the Parliament of England for Lancashire in 1307 and 1311.

References

13th-century births
14th-century deaths
English MPs 1307
English MPs 1311
Members of the Parliament of England (pre-1707) for Lancashire